Far East of Eden: Kabuki Klash is a fighting game developed by Racdym and published by Hudson Soft for the arcades, Neo-Geo, and Neo Geo CD in 1995. It is a spin-off of the popular Japanese console RPG series Tengai Makyo. As of 2018, it is the only Tengai Makyo game to have been released outside Japan.

Gameplay

Far East of Eden: Kabuki Klash is a 2D fighting game, similar in play style to the Samurai Shodown series and The Last Blade series, but with the addition of various power-ups and very over-the-top anime-style special moves. Power-up icons appear on-screen at random, either springing out of the scenery or delivered by the Karasu Tengu. Characters wield weapons, which can be lost and recovered during battle.

Story

Kabuki Klash is set within the land of Jipang (a reference of feudal Japan). The story follows warriors, often swordsmen, in battles against a range of often comical villains.

Characters

Playable
Gokuraku Taro: Co-protagonist from Tengai Makyō II: Manjimaru
Kinu: Co-protagonist from Tengai Makyō II: Manjimaru
Kabuki Danjuro: Co-protagonist from Tengai Makyō II: Manjimaru
Sengoku Manjimaru: Main protagonist from Tengai Makyō II: Manjimaru
Ziria: Main protagonist from Tengai Makyō: Ziria
Yagumo: Original character exclusive to this game
Tsunade: Co-protagonist from Tengai Makyō: Ziria
Orochimaru: Co-protagonist from Tengai Makyō: Ziria

CPU-only
Manto Ace: Recurring comical antagonist throughout series
Karakuri: Antagonist from Tengai Makyō: Karakuri Kakutoden
Jyashinsai: Antagonist from Tengai Makyō: Ziria
Lucifeller: Antagonist from Tengai Makyō: Ziria

Reception 

In Japan, Game Machine listed Far East of Eden: Kabuki Klash on their August 1, 1995 issue as being the sixth most-popular arcade game at the time. According to Famitsu, the AES version sold over 14,775 copies in its first week on the market. The game has been met with positive reception from critics since its release.

VideoGames reviewer Tyrone Rodriguez gave the game a score of 8 (Great), stating: "With its gimmicks and blinding visual style, Kabuki Klash is tremendously fun." The other editors' ratings were 8, 8 and 5. Reviewing the Neo Geo AES version, GamePro praised the advanced graphics and sound effects but criticized the uninteresting special moves and overpowered magic moves. They concluded, "The initial gameplay is arresting, but after a while, it loses its luster. Ultimately, the game doesn't offer more than the state-of-the-art animation and sounds we've come to expect from the Neo Geo." Next Generation criticized the game for having almost nothing to set it apart from the multitude of 2D fighting games already released for the Neo Geo AES, concluding his review with "And now for the standard Neo-Geo fighting game review ending: If you just can't get enough of that 2D fighting action, here's yet another one for you."

Reviewing the Neo Geo CD version, Maximum noted that Kabuki Klash is another one-on-one fighting game for a console already renowned as the preeminent fighting game console, but nonetheless applauded the game for its "fast and fluid" gameplay, "frankly awesome visuals", and original play mechanics.

Notes

References

External links 
 Far East of Eden: Kabuki Klash at GameFAQs
 Far East of Eden: Kabuki Klash at Giant Bomb
 Far East of Eden: Kabuki Klash at Killer List of Videogames
 Far East of Eden: Kabuki Klash at MobyGames

1995 video games
Arcade video games
Tengai Makyo
Fighting games
Hudson Soft games
Multiplayer and single-player video games
Neo Geo games
Neo Geo CD games
Racjin games
Red Entertainment games
SNK games
Video games developed in Japan